Karimabad (also Romanized as Karīmābād) is a village in Anjirabad Rural District, in the Central District of Gorgan County, Golestan Province, Iran. At the 2006 census, its population was 2,808, in 753 families.

References 

Populated places in Gorgan County